Events from the year 1960 in art.

Events
 August 10 – The Scottish National Gallery of Modern Art opens at Inverleith House in the Royal Botanic Garden Edinburgh.
 December – The Huysman Gallery is founded in Los Angeles.
 Launch of Nouveau réalisme movement.
 The Pace Gallery is founded in Boston, Massachusetts.

Awards
 Archibald Prize: Judy Cassab – Stanislaus Rapotec
 Prix de Rome (for painting) – Pierre Carron

Works

 Bison (stone sculpture, University of Oregon, Eugene, Oregon)
 Salvador Dalí – The Ecumenical Council
 M. C. Escher – Ascending and Descending (lithograph)
 Alberto Giacometti – bronzes
 Large Standing Woman I (Museum of Fine Arts, Houston)
 Monumental Head (Hirshhorn Museum and Sculpture Garden, Washington, D.C.)
 Barbara Hepworth
 Archaeon
 Figure for Landscape (bronze)
 Edward Hopper – Second Story Sunlight
 M. F. Husain – The Prancing Horse
 Alex Katz - Black Dress
 Yves Klein
 Anthropometries of The Blue Epoch (performance art)
 A Leap Into The Void
 Alberto Korda – Guerrillero Heroico (photograph of Che Guevara)
 Peter Lanyon – Thermal
 Morris Louis – Unfurled paintings
 Piero Manzoni – Corpo d'aria (artist's multiple)
 Ivan Meštrović – Immigrant Mother (bronze)
 Ceri Richards – Cathedrale Engloutie
 Will Roberts – Woman with Cup of Tea
 Norman Rockwell – Triple Self-Portrait
 Jean Tinguely – Homage to New York (self-destroying sculpture)
 Andy Warhol – "Campbell's Soup"

Births
 February 21 – Isaac Julien, Black British installation artist and filmmaker
 March 13 – Joe Ranft, American magician, animation storyboard artist and voice actor (d. 2005)
 July 28 – Jon J Muth, American author and illustrator
 August 13 – Lorna Simpson, African American photographic and video artist
 September – Shaun Greenhalgh, English art forger
 September 21 – Maurizio Cattelan, Italian satirical sculptor
 October 2 – Joe Sacco, Maltese-born comics journalist
 December 22 – Jean-Michel Basquiat, American artist (d. 1988)
" December 26 - Andrew Graham Dixon, British art historian and broadcaster

Deaths
 January 12 – William Adams Delano, American architect (b. 1874)
 January 16 – Rudulph Evans, American sculptor (b. 1878)
 February 8 – Hakuyō Fuchikami, Japanese photographer (b. 1889)
 February 22 – Paul-Émile Borduas, Canadian painter (b. 1905)
 March 3 – Nina Veselova, Russian painter (b. 1922)
 March 18 – Alexander V. Kuprin, Russian painter (b. 1880)
 March 26 – Francisco Goitia, Mexican realist painter (b. 1882)
 April 13 – Eric Kennington, English sculptor and war artist (b. 1888)
 May 8 – Hugo Alfvén, Swedish musician and painter (b. 1872)
 May 16 – Igor Grabar, Russian painter, publisher, and art historian (b. 1871)
 May 27 – James Montgomery Flagg, American illustrator, poster artist (b. 1877)
 June 6 – Ernest L. Blumenschein, American painter, member of the Taos art colony (b. 1874)
 August 8 – Georg Mayer-Marton, Hungarian-British graphic artist (b. 1897)
 September 20 – David Park, American painter (b. 1911)
 October 22
 Morgan Dennis, American painter and illustrator (b. 1892)
 Alexander Matveyev, Russian sculptor (b. 1878)
 Sreten Stojanović, Serbian sculptor (b. 1898)
 November 14 – Anne Bonnet, Belgian painter (b. 1908)
 November 17 – Gene Ahern, American comic-strip artist (b. 1895)
 November 29 – Fortunato Depero, Italian futurist painter, sculptor, and designer b. 1892)
 December 4 - Dean Cornwell - American illustrator, muralist, and painter (b. 1892)
 date unknown – Charles Pillet, French sculptor and engraver (b. 1869)

See also
 1960 in Fine Arts of the Soviet Union

References

 
Years of the 20th century in art
1960s in art

ru:1960 год в истории изобразительного искусства СССР